The 1894 Montgomery by-election was a parliamentary by-election held on 29 March 1894 for the British House of Commons constituency of Montgomeryshire, known at the time as Montgomery.

Cause
The seat had become vacant when the constituency's Member of Parliament (MP), Stuart Rendel, was elevated to the peerage.

Candidates
Two candidates were nominated.

Arthur Humphreys-Owen was a Welsh barrister, landowner, sometime Deputy Lieutenant of Montgomeryshire, and was chairman of Montgomeryshire County Council for a time. He was the Liberal Party candidate.

Watkin Williams-Wynn was a Welsh soldier, landowner and Master of the Flint and Denbigh Foxhounds. He was the Conservative Party candidate.

Result

See also
 Montgomeryshire constituency
 List of United Kingdom by-elections

References

1894 elections in the United Kingdom
1894 in Wales
1890s elections in Wales
By-elections to the Parliament of the United Kingdom in Welsh constituencies
March 1894 events
Montgomeryshire